An annular solar eclipse occurred on December 14, 1917. A solar eclipse occurs when the Moon passes between Earth and the Sun, thereby totally or partly obscuring the image of the Sun for a viewer on Earth. An annular solar eclipse occurs when the Moon's apparent diameter is smaller than the Sun's, blocking most of the Sun's light and causing the Sun to look like an annulus (ring). An annular eclipse appears as a partial eclipse over a region of the Earth thousands of kilometres wide.

This annular eclipse is notable in that the path of annularity passed over the South Pole.

Related eclipses

Solar eclipses 1916–1920

Saros 121

Metonic series

Notes

References

1917 12 14
1917 in science
1917 12 14
December 1917 events